Davy Crockett Lake may refer to
 Davy Crockett Lake (Crockett County, Tennessee)
Davy Crockett Lake (Greene County, Tennessee) 
 Davy Crockett Lake (Fannin County, Texas)